The ruling party or governing party in a democratic parliamentary or presidential system is the political party or coalition holding a majority of elected positions in a parliament, in the case of parliamentary systems, or holding the executive branch, in presidential systems, that administers the affairs of state after an election. 

In many democratic republic countries like the Philippines, the ruling party is the party of the elected president that is in charge of the executive branch of government. In parliamentary systems, the majority in the legislature also controls the executive branch of government, thus leaving no possibility of opposing parties concurrently occupying the executive and legislative branches of government. In other systems, such as in an American style presidential system, the party of the president does not necessarily also have a legislative majority.

A ruling party is also used to describe the party of one-party states, such as the Chinese Communist Party in the People's Republic of China.

See also
Dominant-party system
Multi-party system
Non-partisan democracy
Party of power
The Establishment

References

 
Types of political parties